Five Flavours Film Festival is an annual film festival held in Warsaw, Poland. It is focused on the cinema of Southeast and East Asia. It commenced in 2007 as a Vietnamese film review and later expanded to include films from other Asian nations, to become one of the most important events of its kind in Europe. Among its guests were many revered Asian filmmakers, including Fruit Chan, Noboru Iguchi, Miwa Nishikawa, Pen-Ek Ratanaruang, Pema Tseden and Midi Z. The festival also engages in educational projects, publishes books on Asian film and, since 2017, it has also started acting as a film distribution company, bringing selected Asian films to broader Polish audience.

New Asian Cinema competition

People's Jury Award
The People's Jury is composed of non-professionals (such as bloggers and film students of all ages) interested in Asian cinema and culture. To participate, the volunteers apply by sending short essays or visual impressions on Asian film. This solution is quite unique among film festivals worldwide. There was no competitive section during the first five editions of the festival (2007-2011), thus the first prize was awarded in 2012. The 2020 edition was conducted exclusively online due to the COVID-19 pandemic.

Netpac Jury Award
Apart from the People's Jury, there was a separate jury during 2016 and 2017 editions of the festival. It was helmed by the NETPAC organization. Their awards went to Tharlo  (Pema Tseden, China) in 2016 and Marlina the Murderer in Four Acts (Mouly Surya, Indonesia) in 2017.

References

External links 
Official Festival Website

Film festivals in Poland
Events in Warsaw
Autumn events in Poland